The following is a list of notable deaths in July 2001.

Entries for each day are listed alphabetically by surname. A typical entry lists information in the following sequence:
 Name, age, country of citizenship at birth, subsequent country of citizenship (if applicable), reason for notability, cause of death (if known), and reference.

July 2001

1
Nikolay Basov, 78, Soviet physicist and co-winner of Nobel Prize in Physics in 1964.
Halina Czerny-Stefańska, 78, Polish pianist.
Bob Cifers, 80, American professional football player (Detroit Lions, Pittsburgh Steelers, Green Bay Packers).
Tony Leswick, 78, Canadian ice hockey player, cancer.
John Maurice Scott, 53, Director General of the Fiji Red Cross.
Beethaeven Scottland, 26, American boxer.

2
Ron Forwick, 57, Canadian footballer.
Jack Gwillim, 91, English character actor (My Fair Lady, Lawrence of Arabia, A Man for All Seasons, Patton).
Sayed Khalifa, 72/3, Sudanese singer.
Israel Shahak, 68, Israeli professor of organic chemistry  and a civil-rights activist.
James P. Vreeland, 91, American Republican Party politician.

3
Aletta Beaujon, 68, Dutch poet and psychologist from the Netherlands Antilles.
Delia Derbyshire, 64, British musician and composer of electronic music (BBC Radiophonic Workshop), renal failure.
Gerald L. Geison, 58, American historian.
Lelord Kordel, 92, Polish-American nutritionist and author of books on healthy living.
Billy Liddell, 79, Scottish footballer.
Sir John Marriott, 78, British philatelist.
Roy Nichols, 68, American guitarist (lead guitarist for Merle Haggard's band).
Mordecai Richler, 69, Canadian author, (The Apprenticeship of Duddy Kravitz, Barney's Version, Jacob Two-Two).
Johnny Russell, 61, American country singer ("Rednecks, White Socks and Blue Ribbon Beer") and songwriter ("Act Naturally").

4
V. Appapillai, 87, Sri Lankan physicist and academic.
Charles Neider, 86, American writer.
Charles Saxton, 88, New Zealand cricketer, rugby player and coach, emphysema.
Anthony Synnot, 79, officer in the Royal Australian Navy.
Fumio Toyoda, 53, Japanese aikido teacher.
Anne Yeats, 82, Irish painter, costume and stage designer.

5
George Dawson, 103, American author (Life Is So Good) and "America's favorite poster child for literacy".
George Ffitch, 72, British radio personality, television correspondent and journalist.
A. D. Flowers, 84, American film special effects artist (two-time winner of Academy Award for Best Visual Effects: Tora! Tora! Tora!, The Poseidon Adventure).
Ernie K-Doe, 68, African-American rhythm-and-blues singer ("Mother-in-Law").
Hannelore Kohl, 68, wife of former German chancellor Helmut Kohl.
Keenan Milton, 26, American professional skateboarder, drowned.

6
Ely Callaway Jr., 82, American entrepreneur
Derek Freeman, 84, New Zealand anthropologist.
Enrique Mateos, 66, Spanish footballer.
Khem Shahani, 78, Indian microbiologist.
Paul Tembo, Zambian politician.

7
Dempsey J. Barron, 79, American politician, President of the Florida Senate.
Molly Lamont, 91, British film actress.
Edward Fiennes-Clinton, 18th Earl of Lincoln, 88, Australian engineer.
Khalil al-Mughrabi, 11, Palestinian boy, shooting victim.
Parmenio Medina, 62, Colombian radio broadcaster and journalist, murdered.
Fred Neil, 65, American folk singer and songwriter ("Everybody's Talkin'").
John Sweeney, 70, Canadian politician, heart attack.
Tim Temerario, 95, American football coach and executive, heart failure.

8
Ernst Baier, 95, German Olympic figure skater (gold medal winner in pairs and silver medal winner in men's singles at the 1936 Winter Olympics).
Elisa Branco, 88, Brazilian communist militant and peace activist.
Big Ed, 29, American rapper, throat cancer.
Andrew E. Gibson, 79, American shipping executive and politician.
Christl Haas, 57, Austrian skier and Olympic champion.
Jia Lanpo, 92, Chinese palaeoanthropologist.
Amiya Bhushan Majumdar, 83, Indian writer.
Neil Midgley, 58, English football referee, cancer.
John O'Shea, 81, New Zealand film director (Broken Barrier, Runaway, Don't Let It Get You).

9
Maria Chabot, 87, American advocate of Native American arts and rancher.
Al Lary, 72, American baseball player.
Victor George, 46, Indian photographer, landslide.
Jorge Novak, 73, Argentine Roman Catholic prelate.
Tessa Prendergast, 72, Jamaican actress, fashion designer, and socialite.
Thomas F. Schweigert, 83, American politician.
Arie van Vliet, 85, Dutch Olympic sprint cyclist.

10
Rafael Cañedo Benítez, 59, Mexican businessman and politician.
Humayun Rashid Choudhury, 72, Bangladeshi diplomat and politician.
Geoffrey Clarkson, 57, English rugby player.
Tony Criscola, 86, American baseball player.
Giulio Gerardi, 88, Italian Olympic cross-country skier (men's 18 kilometre and men's 4 × 10 kilometre relay at the 1936 Winter Olympics).
Álvaro Magaña, 75, Salvadorean politician, President (1982–1984).
Hlwan Moe, 47, Burmese songwriter, composer and singer, car crash.

11
Cândida Branca Flor, 51, Portuguese entertainer and singer, suicide.
Herman Brood, 54, Dutch rock musician and painter, suicide.
J. I. P. James, 87, British orthopaedic surgeon.
Salamat Ali Khan, 66, Pakistani vocalist and artist, kidney failure.
Qateel Shifai, 81, Pakistani poet.
Marco Zanuso, 85, Italian architect and designer.

12
Edward Copeland, 80, English footballer.
Vlado Dapčević, 84, Yugoslav-Montenegrin communist  and revolutionary.
John H. Holdridge, 76, American diplomat.
Paul Magloire, 93, Haitian politician, President (1950–1956).
Fred Marcellino, 61, American illustrator and children's author.
Dora Emilia Mora de Retana, 61, Costa Rican botanist.
Juan Nepomuceno Guerra, 85, Mexican crime lord, bootlegger, and smuggler, respiratory disease.
John Rohde, 74, American gridiron football player and coach, heart attack.
Alioune Sarr, 92, Senegalese historian, author and politician.
Evan Williams, 89, Welsh jockey.
Johnny Wright, 72, British boxer.

13
Daniel Ahmling Chapman Nyaho, 92, Ghanaian statesman, diplomat and academic.
Miguel Gila, 82, Spanish comedian and actor.
David Noyes Jackson, 78, American writer and artist.
Eleanor Summerfield, 80, English actress (Laughter in Paradise, Odongo, Dentist in the Chair, On the Fiddle, The Running Man).
Thomas Taylor, Baron Taylor of Gryfe, 89, British politician.
Wang Tifu, 90, Chinese diplomat.

14
Ian Lowery, 45, English vocalist and poet.
Agustín Navarro, Spanish film director, respiratory disease.
Jack Sheppard, 92, British cave diver.
Arthur Worsley, 80, British ventriloquist.

15
Anthony Ian Berkeley, 36, American rapper and producer, colon cancer.
Ted Berman, 81, American film director, animator, and screenwriter (Bambi, Fantasia, The Black Cauldron).
Tom Chantrell, 84, British film poster artist (The King and I, One Million Years B.C., Far From The Madding Crowd).
Helge Rognlien, 81, Norwegian politician.
Marina Știrbei, 89, Romanian aviator.

16
Tom Askwith, 90, British Olympic rower (1932 Summer Olympics, 1936 Summer Olympics) and a colonial administrator.
John Dagenhard, 84, American baseball player.
George Goodyear, 85, English footballer.
Terry Gordy, 40, pro wrestler (Fabulous Freebirds).
Morris (Maurice De Bevere), 77, Belgian cartoonist (Lucky Luke), embolism.
Janina Oyrzanowska-Poplewska, 83, Polish academic and veterinarian.
Beate Uhse-Rotermund, 81, German female stunt pilot, Luftwaffe pilot during World War II and sex shop owner.

17
Timur Apakidze, 47, Russian fighter pilot and flight specialist, aviation accident.
Abel Carlevaro, 84, Uruguay classical guitar composer, performer and teacher.
Kay Daniels, 60, Australian historian and writer.
Val Feld, 53, Welsh politician, cancer.
Kenneth Boyd Fraser, 84, British virologist and World War II hero (Military Cross).
Katharine Graham, 84, American publisher (The Washington Post).
Elon Hogsett, 97, American baseball player.
Erik Welle-Strand, 86, Norwegian World War II Resistance member and engineer.

18
José María de Azcárate, 82, Spanish art historian, author, and curator, heart attack.
Mimi Fariña, 56, American singer-songwriter and activist, neuroendocrine cancer.
Alexandre Jany, 72, French Olympic swimmer (two-time bronze medal winner in men's 4 × 200 metre freestyle swimming relay at the 1948 and 1952 Summer Olympics).
Ritchie Johnston, 70, New Zealand Olympic track cyclist (men's 2000 metre tandem sprint cycling at the 1956 Summer Olympics).
Boisfeuillet Jones, 88, American educator and administrator of several philanthropic organizations.
Derek Mendl, 86, Argentine cricket player.
Ika Panajotovic, 69, Serbian-American film producer and tennis player, cardiac arrest during surgery.
Barry Shetrone, 63, American baseball player.
Fabio Taglioni, 80, Italian automotive engineer.

19
Erik Barnouw, 93, American historian of radio and television broadcasting.
Paul Beeson, 79, British cinematographer.
Neil Carmichael, Baron Carmichael of Kelvingrove, 79, British politician.
Judy Clay, 62, American soul and gospel singer.
Gunther Gebel-Williams, 83, Polish-American animal trainer (Ringling Bros. and Barnum & Bailey Circus).
Charles King, 89, British Olympic cyclist.
Harold G. Richter, 76, American chemist.
Howard Taylor, 82, Australian painter.

20
Thomas Fantl, 72, German film director and screenwriter.
Milt Gabler, 90, American record producer.
Carlo Giuliani, 23, anti-globalization demonstrator, shot.
James A. O'Flaherty, 58, Irish folk musician, complications from pneumonia.
Mohammed Adam Omar, Sudanese murderer and alleged serial killer, executed by firing squad.
Shyam Sunder Surolia, 80, Indian freedom fighter.
Skeeter Werner Walker, 67, American  alpine ski racer, cancer.

21
Muqbil bin Hadi al-Wadi'i, Islamic scholar, liver disease.
Steve Barton, 47, American actor (The Phantom of the Opera, The Red Shoes), suicide .
Carlo Bo, 90, Italian poet and literary critic.
Sivaji Ganesan, 74, Indian actor.
John Hughes, 93, British Anglican prelate.

22
Bertie Felstead, 106, British World War I soldier and the last surviving soldier to have taken part in the Christmas truce of 1914.
Bob Ferguson, 73, American country music songwriter and record producer, cancer.
Maria Gorokhovskaya, 79, Soviet Olympic gymnast (two gold medals and five silver medals at the 1952 Summer Olympics).
Frances Horwich, 94, American educator and television host (Ding Dong School).
Ron Hull, 61, American college football player (UCLA Bruins football) and coach (Cal State Los Angeles).
Herbert L. Ley Jr., 77, American physician and head of the U.S. F.D.A., cardiovascular disease.
Indro Montanelli, 92, Italian journalist and historian.
David Nelson, 38, English rugby player, murdered.
Stanley Jedidiah Samartha, 80, Indian theologian.

23
Douglas Boyle, 77, Canadian Forces officer.
Sir Allan Trewby, 84, British admiral.
Eudora Welty, 92, American writer (Pulitzer Prize for The Optimist's Daughter, Presidential Medal of Freedom, Order of the South).

24
Victor Arimondi, 58, Italian American photographer and model, HIV-related illness.
Carrie Best, 98, Canadian journalist and social activist.
Georges Dor, 70, Canadian singer and songwriter ("Le Manic"), author, playwright and theatrical producer.
Lewis C. Hudson, 90, United States Marine Corps brigadier general.
May Hyman Lesser, American medical illustrator.
James M. Thomson, 76, American politician.
Hiroshi Tsuburaya, 37, Japanese actor, liver cancer.

25
Fahd bin Salman bin Abdulaziz Al Saud, 46, member of the House of Saud, heart failure.
Levi Borgstrom, 81, Swedish-New Zealand carver.
Carmen Portinho, 98, Brazilian civil engineer, urbanist, and feminist.
Emma Clara Schweer, 105, America's oldest elected politician.

26
Rex T. Barber, 84, American fighter pilot during World War II.
Jacques Bens, 70, French writer and poet.
Henry Coston, 90, French far-right  journalist, collaborationist and conspiracy theorist.
Phoolan Devi, 37, Indian dacoit and politician, assassinated.
Josef Klaus, 90, Austrian politician, chancellor (1964-1970).
H. Rex Lee, 91, American government diplomat and governor.
Charles Rob, 88, British surgeon.
Giuseppe Sensi, 94, Italian cardinal of the Roman Catholic Church.
Peter von Zahn, 88, German author, film maker, and journalist.

27
Sir Harold Beeley, 92, British diplomat.
Thomas Pitt Cholmondeley-Tapper, 90, New Zealand auto racing driver.
Jan Falkowski, 89, Polish Air Force flying ace during World War II.
Darrell Huff, 88, American writer.
Harold Land, 72, American hard bop and post-bop tenor saxophonist.
Rhonda Sing, 40, Canadian professional wrestler, heart attack.
Leon Wilkeson, 49, American musician (Lynyrd Skynyrd).

28
Eric Bedford, 91, British architect.
George Burrell, 80, Scottish rugby player.
John Easton, 68, American baseball player.
Joan Finney, 76, American politician and 42nd governor of Kansas (1991–1995).
Eldon Grier, 84, Canadian poet and artist.
Baby LeRoy, 69, American child actor.
Ahmed Sofa, 58, Bangladeshi writer, novelist, and poet, cardiac arrest.
Martin Stern Jr., 84, American architect.
Norman Wengert, 84, American political scientist.
Futaro Yamada, 79, Japanese author.

29
Edward Gierek, 88, Polish communist politician, First Secretary of the Polish United Workers' Party (1970-1980).
Wau Holland, 49, German computer hacker, co-founder of the Chaos Computer Club.
Tommy Millar, 62, Scottish football player.
Alex Nicol, 85, American actor (South Pacific, Cat on a Hot Tin Roof, The Twilight Zone, The Outer Limits).
Edward Roberts, 93, British prelate.
Katharine Stinson, 83, American aeronautical engineer.
Elizabeth Yates, 95, American children's author.

30
Ervín Černý, 87, Czech doctor and scientist.
Dennis Coralluzzo, 48, American professional wrestling promoter, brain hemorrhage.
Harry Gersh, 88, American writer and historian (oldest known student to enroll as a freshman at Harvard College).
Wilford Gibson, 76, British police officer.
Thelma Grambo, 77, American baseball player (All-American Girls Professional Baseball League).
Joseph-Philippe Guay, 85, Canadian member of Parliament (House of Commons representing St. Boniface, Senate of Canada representing St. Boniface).
Alex Nahigian, 82, American college baseball and football player and coach.
Olga Nolla, 62, Puerto Rican poet, writer, and journalist, heart attack.
Anton Schwarzkopf, 77, German roller coaster manufacturer.
Petar B. Vasilev, 83, Bulgarian film director and screenwriter.
John Walters, 62, British radio producer, presenter and musician, heart attack.

31
Poul Anderson, 74, American science fiction author (seven Hugo Awards and three Nebula Awards).
Bill Borthwick, 76, Australian politician.
Pelageya Danilova, 83, Russian artistic gymnast and Olympian.
A. G. Dickens, 91, British historian.
Friedrich Franz, Hereditary Grand Duke of Mecklenburg-Schwerin, 91, German heir and member of the Waffen-SS during World War II.
Francisco da Costa Gomes, 87, Portuguese military officer and politician, president (1974-1976).
Miklós Vásárhelyi, 83, Hungarian journalist and politician, member of the National Assembly (1990–1994)

References 

2001-07
 07